Erika concentration camp was a Nazi concentration camp during the Second World War. The camp was situated at the Besthemerberg near Ommen. The camp was designated mostly for Dutchmen convicted of black market trade or resistance to the occupational authorities; only eight Jews were detained here.

The camp was notorious for the brutal behaviour of its personnel, leading Dutch judges to refuse to send convicts there in 1943. The camp was turned into an Arbeitserziehungslager mostly for those refusing to do forced labour, but in the autumn of 1944 it once again became a penal camp. The camp was liberated on 11 April 1945.

Herbertus Bikker also known as The Butcher of Ommen was a member of the Waffen-SS. In this function he served as a guard at the prison and work camp Erika near Ommen. He received his nickname due to his brutal behaviour at the prison camp.

From 1945 to 1946, the camp was instead used to detain Dutchmen who had collaborated with the German occupiers.

References

Nazi concentration camps in the Netherlands
Kamp Erika
Kamp Erika

es:Ommen#Campo de concentración Kamp Erika